Ernest Greene was a lawyer and state legislator in Illinois. He was elected to the Illinois House of Representatives from Cook County.

He studied at Talladega College and Kent College of Law. He was elected in 1936. He also served as a Chicago Ward Committeeman.

References

20th-century American politicians

Year of birth missing (living people)
Living people
Chicago-Kent College of Law alumni
Members of the Illinois House of Representatives
Talladega College alumni
Politicians from Chicago